Christopher Lynch (born 1963) is a political scientist and theorist who focuses his research on Machiavelli. Lynch has published one book and numerous articles in academic journals.

Publications 
Lynch translated, edited, and provided an introduction of Niccolò Machiavelli's Art of War. While staying true to the original text, Lynch was also able to translate it into modern English to allow the audience to respect Machiavelli's writings on the relationship between war and politics. Additionally, the introduction that Lynch wrote provides political and historical context and its current relevance. Furthermore, the book includes an interpretive essay that explores three different aspects of the text: philosophical, military, and political.

Lynch coedited Principle and Prudence in Western Political Thought, a collection of essays published in 2016.

Academic life 
At Boston College, Lynch was a Bradley Postdoctoral Fellow. He taught at the University of Dallas Rome campus. In 2005, he participated in ISI/Jack Miller Center’s Lehrman Summer Institute. In 2006, he was Faculty Fellow at the Foundation for Defense of Democracies. Between 2006 and 2007, Lynch was Senior Advisor at the United States Department of State. And in 2011, he was a faculty member on the Hertog Political Studies Program in Washington, D.C. Lynch was granted the Olin Faculty Fellowship to support his work on a new book about Machiavelli's thoughts on war. Additionally, on the 500th anniversary of the writing of Machiavelli's The Prince, Lynch was discussant in the "Machiavelli's The Prince at 500: Rereading The Prince in the 21st Century" Panel at the 2013 American Political Science Association (APSA) Annual Meeting and Exhibition in Chicago, and he spoke at Harvard University on the question of whether Machiavelli is a philosopher. Lynch has been a part of workshops and seminars at Army War College, Naval War College, and National Defense University. Additionally, he has presented lectures at the Air Force Academy and the National War College. Currently, Lynch is Professor of Great Ideas and Political Science at Carthage College.

Education 
Lynch received a Bachelor of Arts from St. John's College and his master's and doctorate from University of Chicago's Committee on Social Thought.

Personal life 
Lynch lives in Chicago, with his wife, Kate. They have three children: Emily, Henry and Grace.

References 

1963 births
Living people
Date of birth missing (living people)
American political scientists
Carthage College faculty
University of Dallas faculty